The Sherman Fisher Girls were a British dance troupe active in the 1930s, 1940s and 1950s. Active in variety shows on the Music Hall circuit, they also featured at the Royal Variety Show. In 1938 and 1939 they were part of the hit revue These Foolish Things at the London Palladium. They also appeared in a number of British films during the era.

Selected filmography
 This Week of Grace (1933)
 Music Hall (1934)
 The Night Club Queen (1934)
 Father O'Flynn (1935)
 Sunshine Ahead (1936)
 Sing as You Swing (1937)
 Band Waggon (1940)

References

Bibliography
 Delfont, Bernard Baron. Curtain Up!: The Story of the Royal Variety Performance. Robson Books, 1989.
 Double, Oliver. Britain Had Talent: A History of Variety Theatre. Macmillan, 2012.
 Wearing, J.P. The London Stage 1930-1939: A Calendar of Productions, Performers, and Personnel.  Rowman & Littlefield, 2014.

External links

Dance companies in the United Kingdom